Ronny Büchel (born 19 March 1982) is a Liechtensteiner former international footballer who last played as a midfielder for FC Triesen, and formerly played for FC Vaduz, Young Boys, FC Chur 97, USV Eschen/Mauren, FC Ruggell and Buchs.

Career

Club career
Büchel's first big success was the Swiss championship title with the U17 team in Liechtenstein, which takes part in the Swiss Youth Championship. In 2001 he moved to the National League B with FC Vaduz and then switched to the Swiss first division club BSC Young Boys from Bern. In Bern, however, the 19-year-old was unable to break through and moved back to FC Vaduz after only one year. There too, the offensive player was plagued by many injuries and he hardly came into practice, which led him to move to FC Chur 97 in the third Swiss league. There he showed an increasing shape curve after starting difficulties, but nevertheless he moved to the Liechtenstein club USV Eschen-Mauren at the beginning of the 2004/05 season, which played in the fourth Swiss league.

Coaching and later career
In the summer 2011 he moved to Liechtenstein club FC Ruggell as a player-coach. He left the club in 2013.

Since 2009, Büchel have had several functions as a coach for the Liechtenstein Football Association (LFV), mainly working with the youth players. In January 2013, he was hired as a chief preformation for LFV and would also coach the U14 national team selection.

In the summer 2013, he joined FC Buchs. He then joined FC Triesen in July 2015.

In 2017 he played for FC Triesenberg.

References

External links
 

1982 births
Living people
Liechtenstein footballers
Liechtenstein international footballers
FC Vaduz players
BSC Young Boys players
FC Chur 97 players
USV Eschen/Mauren players
FC Ruggell players
FC Triesen players
FC Triesenberg players
Liechtenstein football managers
Association football midfielders
People from Vaduz